LTH may refer to:

 Faculty of Engineering (LTH), Lund University
 Licentiate of Theology (LTh), a theological degree
 Link Theory Holdings, a Japanese fashion company
 Prolactin, or luteotropic hormone, a human protein
 BD-R LTH is a write-once Blu-ray disc format